José Sérgio Presti (born March 8, 1957 in São Paulo), best known as Zé Sérgio, is a former football (soccer) player who played as a striker.

He played for clubs São Paulo (1977–1984), Santos (1984–1986), Vasco da Gama (1986–1987) and ended his career in Japan J-League with Kashiwa Reysol (1989–1991 and managed in 1995).

He won one Brazilian League (1977), two São Paulo State League (1980 and 1981), also won campeonato Paulista 1984 (Santos FC), one Rio de Janeiro State League (1987) For the Brazil national football team he won 25 international caps between May 1978 and May 1981, scored five goals and was on their roster for the 1978 FIFA World Cup.

Managerial statistics

References

External links

1957 births
Living people
Footballers from São Paulo
Brazilian footballers
Brazilian expatriate footballers
Association football forwards
Kashiwa Reysol players
São Paulo FC players
Santos FC players
CR Vasco da Gama players
Expatriate footballers in Japan
Japan Soccer League players
1978 FIFA World Cup players
1979 Copa América players
Campeonato Brasileiro Série A players
Brazilian football managers
Brazil international footballers
J1 League managers
Kashiwa Reysol managers
Associação Atlética Ponte Preta managers
Expatriate football managers in Japan